The 1972 Individual Ice Speedway World Championship was the seventh edition of the World Championship.

The winner was Gabdrakhman Kadyrov of the Soviet Union for the fifth time.

Final 
 March 5
  Nassjo

References

Ice speedway competitions
Ice